The Bay of Grignano comprises a small portion of the Gulf of Trieste. It is about 4 miles from the Molo Audace and Piazza dell'Unità d'Italia, downtown Trieste. The Bay, rich in marine life is an environmentally protected area. The Castello di Miramare overlooks the Bay. Down by the water, at the end of a small pier one can see the Sphinx.

Grignano